The National Cheng Kung University Hospital (NCKU Hospital) is a hospital in North District, Tainan, Taiwan.

History
NCKU Hospital was constructed in 1985 and opened to the public on 12 June 1988. In July 1993, it was upgraded to a medical center.

Architecture
The hospital consists of 14 floors with a total floor area of 112,860 m2. It consists of 34 clinical care departments, 18 administrative departments and 3 allied health departments. It has a total number of 1,342 beds.

Transportation
The hospital is accessible within walking distance north east of Tainan Station of Taiwan Railways.

See also
 List of hospitals in Taiwan
 National Cheng Kung University

References

External links
 

1988 establishments in Taiwan
Buildings and structures in Tainan
Hospitals established in 1988
National Cheng Kung University
Teaching hospitals in Taiwan